Portugal participated in the Eurovision Song Contest 2015 with the song "Há um mar que nos separa" written by Miguel Gameiro. The song was performed by Leonor Andrade. The Portuguese broadcaster Rádio e Televisão de Portugal (RTP) organised the national final Festival da Canção 2015 in order to select the Portuguese entry for the 2015 contest in Vienna, Austria. After two semi-finals and a final which took place in March 2015, "Há um mar que nos separa" performed by Leonor Andrade emerged as the winner after receiving the most public televotes.

Portugal was drawn to compete in the second semi-final of the Eurovision Song Contest which took place on 21 May 2015. Performing during the show in position 7, "Há um mar que nos separa" was not announced among the top 10 entries of the first semi-final and therefore did not qualify to compete in the final. It was later revealed that Portugal placed fourteenth out of the 17 participating countries in the semi-final with 19 points.

Background 

Prior to the 2015 contest, Portugal had participated in the Eurovision Song Contest forty-seven times since its first entry in 1964. The nation's highest placing in the contest was sixth, which they achieved in 1996 with the song "O meu coração não tem cor" performed by Lúcia Moniz. Following the introduction of semi-finals for the 2004, Portugal had featured in only three finals. Portugal's least successful result has been last place, which they have achieved on three occasions, most recently in 1997 with the song "Antes do adeus" performed by Célia Lawson. Portugal has also received nul points on two occasions; in 1964 and 1997. The nation failed to qualify to the final in 2014 with the song "Quero ser tua" performed by Suzy.

The Portuguese national broadcaster, Rádio e Televisão de Portugal (RTP), broadcasts the event within Portugal and organises the selection process for the nation's entry. RTP confirmed Portugal's participation in the 2015 Eurovision Song Contest on 29 July 2014. The broadcaster has traditionally selected the Portuguese entry for the Eurovision Song Contest via the music competition Festival da Canção, with exceptions in 1988 and 2005 when the Portuguese entries were internally selected. Along with their participation confirmation, the broadcaster revealed details regarding their selection procedure and announced the organization of Festival da Canção 2015 in order to select the 2015 Portuguese entry.

Before Eurovision

Festival da Canção 2015 
Festival da Canção 2015 was the 50th edition of Festival da Canção that selected Portugal's entry for the Eurovision Song Contest 2015. Twelve entries competed in the competition that consisted of two semi-finals held on 3 and 5 March 2015 leading to a six-song final on 7 March 2015. All three shows of the competition took place at RTP's Studio 2 in Lisbon and were broadcast on RTP1, RTP África and RTP Internacional as well as online via the broadcaster's official website rtp.pt.

Format
The format of the competition consisted of three shows: two semi-finals on 3 and 5 March 2015 and the final on 7 March 2015. Each semi-final featured six competing entries from which three advanced from each show to complete the eight song lineup in the final. Results during the semi-finals and the final were determined by a jury panel appointed by the competing composers in their respective semi-finals and public televoting. In each semi-final, the songs first faced a public televote from which two advanced to the final. The jury then selected an additional qualifier from the remaining entries to proceed in the competition. In the final, the songs first faced a public televote from which two advanced to a second round of voting, the superfinal. The jury then selected an additional qualifier from the remaining entries to proceed to the superfinal, during which a public televote exclusively determined which entry would be the winner.

Competing entries
Twelve composers were invited by RTP for the competition. The composers, which both created the songs and selected its performers, were required to submit the final versions of their entries by 5 February 2015. Songs were required to be submitted in Portuguese. The selected composers were:

 Adelaide Ferreira
 Augusto Madureira
 Carlos Massa
Diogo Rodrigues (Churky)
 Fernando Abrantes
 Gonçalo Tavares
 Héber Marques
 Miguel Gameiro
 Nuno Feist
 Renato Júnior
 Sara Tavares
 Sebastião Antunes

The competing artists were revealed on 19 February 2015. Among the competing artists were former Eurovision Song Contest entrants Simone de Oliveira, who represented Portugal in 1965 and 1969 contests, and Adelaide Ferreira, who represented Portugal in the 1985 contest.

Shows

Semi-finals
The two semi-finals took place on 3 and 5 March 2015. The first semi-final was hosted by Joana Teles and Jorge Gabriel while the second semi-final was hosted by Sílvia Alberto and José Carlos Malato. In each semi-final six entries competed and three advanced to the final. The competing entries first faced a public televote where the top two songs advanced, with an additional qualifier selected from the remaining four entries by a jury panel. 

In addition to the performances of the competing entries, Portuguese Eurovision 1964 entrant António Calvário and Portuguese Eurovision 2014 entrant Suzy performed as the interval acts in the first semi-final, while Eládio Clímaco and Portuguese Eurovision 1996 entrant Lucia Móniz performed as the interval acts in the second semi-final.

Final
The final took place on 7 March 2015, hosted by Júlio Isidro and Catarina Furtado. The winner was selected over two rounds of voting. In the first round, the six competing entries that qualified from the two preceding semi-finals first faced a public televote where the top two songs advanced to the second round, the superfinal, with an additional qualifier was selected from the remaining four entries by a jury panel. In the superfinal, the winner, "Há um mar que nos separa" performed by Leonor Andrade, was selected solely by a public televote. Agir and Portuguese Eurovision 1974 entrant Paulo de Carvalho performed as the interval acts.

At Eurovision 

According to Eurovision rules, all nations with the exceptions of the host country and the "Big Five" (France, Germany, Italy, Spain and the United Kingdom) are required to qualify from one of two semi-finals in order to compete for the final; the top ten countries from each semi-final progress to the final. In the 2015 contest, Australia also competed directly in the final as an invited guest nation. The European Broadcasting Union (EBU) split up the competing countries into six different pots based on voting patterns from previous contests, with countries with favourable voting histories put into the same pot. On 26 January 2015, a special allocation draw was held which placed each country into one of the two semi-finals, as well as which half of the show they would perform in. Portugal was placed into the second semi-final, to be held on 21 May 2015, and was scheduled to perform in the first half of the show.

Once all the competing songs for the 2015 contest had been released, the running order for the semi-finals was decided by the shows' producers rather than through another draw, so that similar songs were not placed next to each other. Portugal was set to perform in position 7, following the entry from Norway and before the entry from Czech Republic.

In Portugal, the three shows were broadcast on RTP1 and RTP Internacional with commentary by Hélder Reis and Ramon Galarza. The second semi-final and the final were broadcast live, while the first semi-final was broadcast on delay. The Portuguese spokesperson, who announced the Portuguese votes during the final, was 2014 contest entrant Suzy.

Semi-final

Leonor Andrade took part in technical rehearsals on 13 and 16 May, followed by dress rehearsals on 20 and 21 May. This included the jury final where professional juries of each country watched and voted on the competing entries.

The Portuguese performance featured Leonor Andrade dressed in a black leather outfit with flowing trains performing at a microphone stand with a wind machine special effect. Four backing vocalists were lined up on Andrade's side also dressed in black: Pedro Mimoso, Ricardo Quintas, Tânia Tavares and Carla Ribeiro. The LED screens displayed images of a large city which transitioned to waves in blue, black and white.

At the end of the show, Portugal failed to qualify to the final and was not announced among the top ten nations. It was later revealed that Portugal placed fourteenth in the semi-final, receiving a total of 19 points.

Voting
Voting during the three shows involved each country awarding points from 1-8, 10 and 12 as determined by a combination of 50% national jury and 50% televoting. Each nation's jury consisted of five music industry professionals who were citizens of the country they represent, with their names published before the contest to ensure transparency. This jury was asked to judge each contestant based on: vocal capacity; the stage performance; the song's composition and originality; and the overall impression by the act. In addition, no member of a national jury could be related in any way to any of the competing acts in such a way that they cannot vote impartially and independently. The individual rankings of each jury member were released shortly after the grand final.

Following the release of the full split voting by the EBU after the conclusion of the competition, it was revealed that Portugal had placed thirteenth with both the public televote and the jury vote in the second semi-final. In the public vote, Portugal scored 24 points, while with the jury vote, Portugal scored 23 points.

Below is a breakdown of points awarded to Portugal and awarded by Portugal in the second semi-final and grand final of the contest, and the breakdown of the jury voting and televoting conducted during the two shows:

Points awarded to Portugal

Points awarded by Portugal

Detailed voting results
The following members comprised the Portuguese jury:
 Renato Júnior (jury chairperson)music producer, composer
 Adelaide Ferreirasinger, songwriter, represented Portugal in the 1985 contest 
 musician, singer, songwriter
 Inês Santossinger, actress, represented Portugal in the 1998 contest as member of Alma Lusa
 maestro, music teacher (jury member in semi-final 2)
 Nuno Marques da Silvasongwriter (jury member in the final)

References 

2015
Countries in the Eurovision Song Contest 2015
Eurovision